Charles Otto Puth Jr. (born December 2, 1991) is an American singer, songwriter, and record producer. His initial exposure came through the viral success of his song videos uploaded to YouTube. Puth signed with the record label eleveneleven in 2011 after performing on The Ellen DeGeneres Show, while songwriting and producing material for other artists. 

Puth eventually signed to Atlantic Records and Artist Partner Group and released his debut single, "Marvin Gaye" (featuring Meghan Trainor), in 2015. Later that year he was featured on the single "See You Again" by Wiz Khalifa, which peaked at number one on the US Billboard Hot 100 for 12 non-consecutive weeks, was certified 11× Platinum by the RIAA, and earned him a Golden Globe Award for Best Original Song nomination, along with three nominations at the 58th Annual Grammy Awards, including one for Song of the Year.

Puth's debut studio album, Nine Track Mind, was released in 2016 to moderate commercial success and generally negative critical reception. The album included the single "We Don't Talk Anymore" (featuring Selena Gomez), which peaked at number 9 on the Billboard Hot 100. In 2017, he released two singles, "Attention" and "How Long"; they were certified 4× and 2× Platinum, respectively, by the RIAA. Both were included on his second studio album, Voicenotes (2018), which was generally received positively by critics and peaked at number 4 on the Billboard 200. 

Puth's third studio album, Charlie, was released in 2022. It spawned the singles "Light Switch" and "Left and Right" (featuring Jungkook), both of which peaked within the top 40 of the Hot 100 and were certified platinum and gold, respectively, by the RIAA.

Early life
Charles Otto Puth Jr. was born December 2, 1991, in Rumson, New Jersey, to Debra, a music teacher who also wrote commercials for HBO, and Charles Otto Puth Sr., a builder and real estate agent. He has two younger siblings, twins Stephen and Mikaela. The three have a Catholic father and a Jewish mother. Charles Sr. had a mother with Italian ancestry and a father of German and Hungarian descent.

As a two-year-old, Puth's right eyebrow was permanently scarred in a nearly fatal dog-bite incident. His mother introduced him to classical music and began teaching him the piano at age four. He started studying jazz at age 10 and participated in a summer youth jazz ensemble at Count Basie Theatre's Cool School in Red Bank, New Jersey at 12. Puth was once hired by The Count Basie Theatre to play in a Charlie Brown production. In grade six, he went door to door selling a Christmas album called Have a Very Charlie Christmas that he had recorded and produced, making $600 in sales.

He attended the Holy Cross School, Rumson, and Forrestdale Middle School, before graduating from the Rumson-Fair Haven Regional High School in 2010. During his seventh grade to senior years, he attended Manhattan School of Music Pre-College as a jazz piano major and a classical studies minor. Puth is a 2013 graduate of Berklee College of Music, where he majored in music production and engineering.

Career

2009–2014: Career beginnings 
In September 2009, he started his own YouTube channel, entitled Charlies Vlogs, posting comedy videos and acoustic covers. In 2010, Puth released the music video of his first song, "These Are My Sexy Shades". In December 2010, he released his debut extended play, The Otto Tunes, an independent release. In 2011, he won an online video competition sponsored by Perez Hilton, Can You Sing?, with a version of Adele's "Someone like You" which he performed with Emily Luther. In the same year Ellen DeGeneres announced that she had signed Puth and Luther to her label, eleveneleven, after seeing their performance of Adele's "Someone like You". Puth and Luther had performed the song on the show. In December 2012 he released a promotional single, "Break Again", with additional vocals by Emily Luther. The music video was released days later. On January 25, 2012, Puth and Luther performed the song and Lady Antebellum's "Need You Now" on The Ellen DeGeneres Show. Puth also performed at an event supporting DKMS Delete Blood Cancer, the world's largest bone marrow donor center, in October 2012. Puth left eleveneleven in late 2012.

On October 23, 2013, he released his second independent extended play, Ego, to streaming online. Puth was credited with the production and writing of songs and jingles for fellow YouTube personalities. He wrote the theme song for Shane Dawson's Shane and Friends podcast and skits, the intro jingle for the videos of the Vlogger family the SHAYTARDS, the original theme song for Charles Trippy's vlog Internet Killed Television, and a song for the tour and movie of YouTube group Our 2nd Life, as well as several singles for Our 2nd Life member Ricky Dillon. In 2014 he released the promotional single "L.U.V." The music video was directed by Andrew Vallentine In the same year, he co-wrote the song "Celebrate" on Pitbull's eighth studio album Globalization.

2015–2016: "See You Again" and Nine Track Mind 

In early 2015, Puth signed with APG/Atlantic and his previous records were removed from iTunes. In February 2015, Puth released his debut single "Marvin Gaye", which features American singer-songwriter Meghan Trainor. The single has been certified 2× Platinum in Australia, topped the charts in New Zealand, Ireland, and the United Kingdom, and peaked at number 21 on the US Billboard Hot 100. Puth wrote, co-produced, and was featured on a song with Wiz Khalifa, "See You Again", a tribute to the late Paul Walker, included in the Furious 7 soundtrack. While Khalifa wrote the rap lyrics, the rest of the song has been credited to Puth. The song peaked at number one on the Hot 100 chart for 12 non-consecutive weeks. "See You Again" was nominated for three Grammy Awards: Song of the Year, Best Pop Duo/Group Performance and Best Song Written for Visual Media. It was also shortlisted for the Song of the Year for the BBC Music Awards and was nominated for the Golden Globe Award for Best Original Song at the 73rd Golden Globe Awards. He produced the song "Slow Motion" for Trey Songz and has arranged sessions with Jason Derulo and Lil Wayne.

Puth starred as Meghan Trainor's love interest in the music video for her song "Dear Future Husband", released in March 2015. In the video, she meets Puth on an online dating service and he comes to Trainor's home with a carryout pizza, which succeeds in impressing her. On May 1, 2015, Puth released a five-song extended play, Some Type of Love. In June 2015, he released the promotional single "Nothing but Trouble" with Lil Wayne, from the soundtrack to the documentary 808: The Movie. During 2015, Puth worked on several albums of other artists. He co-wrote and produced the "Broke" and "Pull Up" for Jason Derulo's album Everything Is 4, co-wrote "Bombastic" with Bonnie McKee from the album of the same title, and produced "Working Class Heroes (Work)" on CeeLo Green's album Heart Blanche.

Pre-orders for Puth's debut studio album Nine Track Mind began on August 20, 2015, along with the second single "One Call Away". The song peaked at number 12 in the United States, 26 in the United Kingdom and 4 in Australia. By June 2017 the song had sold 1,575,475 copies domestically. Puth released a remix for the song, entitled "One Call Away (Coast to Coast Mix)", featuring American rapper Tyga, American singers Ty Dolla Sign and Brett Eldredge and Mexican singer Sofia Reyes.

His debut album, Nine Track Mind, was released on January 29, 2016. The album debuted at number three in the United Kingdom. The album itself peaked at number 6 on the Billboard 200. It also received a score of 37 out of 100 on Metacritic, becoming the 15th worst reviewed album on the site. Puth embarked his debut live concert, Nine Track Mind Tour, in March 2016.

In 2016, Puth was the first musician to sign a deal with Deutsch Music, a subsidiary of Deutsch Inc.

2017–2018: Voicenotes

On April 21, 2017, Puth released "Attention", the lead single from his second studio album Voicenotes. The song peaked at number five on the Billboard Hot 100, becoming his highest-charting single on the chart as a solo artist as of April 2022. The second single from Voicenotes, "How Long", was released on October 5, 2017, and peaked at number 21 on the Billboard Hot 100. Puth also collaborated with One Direction's Liam Payne on the single "Bedroom Floor", which he co-produced and provided background vocals for. In 2018, he was featured on G-Eazy's single "Sober". On January 4, 2018, Puth released the first promotional single from Voicenotes, "If You Leave Me Now" featuring Boyz II Men. Puth also announced that he would be pushing the release date to May 11, 2018, from its original release date of January 19, 2018.

On March 15, 2018, "Done for Me" was released as the third single from Voicenotes. The song features singer Kehlani. The song also peaked at No. 53 on the Billboard Hot 100. On March 25, 2018, Puth released the fourth single "Change" featuring James Taylor.  A day earlier, Puth sang the song at the March for Our Lives event in Los Angeles. The album also features the songs "The Way I Am" the fifth single off the album.

Voicenotes was released on May 11, 2018, to generally positive reviews from critics; it debuted and peaked at number four on the US Billboard 200 with 58,000 album-equivalent units, of which 39,000 were pure album sales. Puth embarked on the Voicenotes Tour in 2018, with Hailee Steinfeld as a special guest.

2019–present: Charlie 
In August 2019, Puth released "I Warned Myself"; another single, "Mother", was released in September, and a third, "Cheating on You", in October. In early 2020, Puth announced that he had scrapped what he had written for his third studio album; he remarked in 2022 that he "didn't really like any of the music" he released in 2019, and that he "felt like [he] was kind of pretending to be a cool guy". He released "Girlfriend" in June and "Hard on Yourself", featuring Blackbear, in August. In September 2021, Puth released "After All" with Elton John as part of John's album The Lockdown Sessions. 

The same month he started documenting on TikTok a process of "combin[ing] a seemingly random bunch of thoughts and noises made with different objects into a pop song", which went viral on the platform; this led to the release of "Light Switch" on January 20, 2022, as the first single from his third studio album, Charlie. This was followed by "That's Hilarious" in April and "Left and Right" featuring Jungkook in June. On July 7, Puth revealed Charlie cover art and its release date. "Smells Like Me", "I Don't Think That I Like Her", and "Charlie Be Quiet!" were all released in September. Charlie was released on October 7 along with a music video for its song "Loser".

Personal life
Growing up, Puth was bullied at school. He said, "They would team up against me so bad and they would kick me in a place that wouldn't feel fantastic and I would need to throw up and they would then say I was pretending to throw up." On On Air with Ryan Seacrest he said he had a nervous breakdown from "just being overworked—and I'm in my head a lot and that, in combination with jetlag and, you know, the self-realization that I am getting more famous and my privacy goes out the window pretty much every day—it's just not what I'm used to, and I don't think I'm ever going to be used to it, and my therapy is to just put melody to it and sing it."

Puth started collaborating with clothing brand Hollister Co. in 2017.

He said that Justin Bieber's "viral leap into superstardom as a result of YouTube" influenced him to attempt the same.

Discography

 Nine Track Mind (2016)
 Voicenotes (2018)
 Charlie (2022)

Filmography

Awards and nominations

Concert tours
Headlining
Nine Track Mind Tour (2016)
Don't Talk Tour (2016)
Voicenotes Tour (2018)
One Night Only Tour (2022)
Charlie the Live Experience (2023)

Co-headlining
Jingle Ball Tour 2015 (with various artists) (2015)
Jingle Ball Tour 2016 (with various artists) (2016)
Jingle Ball Tour 2017 (with various artists) (2017)
Jingle Ball Tour 2019 (with various artists) (2019)
Supporting
Illuminate World Tour (Shawn Mendes) (2017)

See also
List of artists who reached number one in the United States

References

External links

Charlie Puth on Spotify

1991 births
Living people
21st-century American singers
Berklee College of Music alumni
American male singer-songwriters
Record producers from New Jersey
Singer-songwriters from New Jersey
Atlantic Records artists
People from Rumson, New Jersey
Rumson-Fair Haven Regional High School alumni
American contemporary R&B singers
American male pop singers
American pop rock singers
21st-century American male singers
American people of Italian descent
American people of German-Jewish descent
American people of Hungarian-Jewish descent